is a 11-hectare (27-acre) zoo located at Tennōji Park in Tennōji-ku, Osaka, Japan, opened on January 1, 1915. It is the third zoo to be built in Japan and is located southwest of the Shitennō-ji temple, the first Buddhist temple in Japan.

Attractions and Animals

African Savanna Zone
African Savanna
The habitat features expansive habitats for African animals. These habitats are arranged so that predators like lions and hyenas appear to be sharing the same space with their prey.

 Common dwarf mongoose
 Common eland
 Eastern black rhinoceros
 Egyptian goose
 Grant's zebra
 Hippopotamus
 Lesser flamingo
 Lion
 Marabou stork
 Nile tilapia
 Reticulated giraffe
 Rock hyrax
 Spotted hyena

IFAR Reptile House
 Aldabra giant tortoise
 American alligator
 Burmese python
 Chinese alligator
 Japanese giant salamander

Other animals
 Andean condor
 Amur tiger
 Jaguar
 Japanese golden eagle
 Mongolian wolf
 Mouflon
 Red panda

Asian Tropical Rainforest Zone
Themed after a Southeast Asian rainforest, this zone formerly housed Asian elephants, the last of which, a female named Hiroko passed away in 2018.

Nocturnal House
The zoo is the only zoo in Japan to house kiwis.

 Egyptian fruit bat
 Japanese raccoon dog
 North Island brown kiwi
 Raccoon

Chimpanzee, Monkey and Baboon House

 Black-and-white ruffed lemur
 Chimpanzee
 De Brazza's monkey
 Drill
 François' langur
 Grivet
 Lion-tailed macaque
 Mandrill
 Siamang
 Tufted capuchin

Other animals
 Sika deer
 Emu

Former Petting Zone and Surrounding Area
Crane House
 Demoiselle crane
 Grey crowned crane
 Hooded crane
 Red-crowned crane

Other
 American flamingo
 Chilean flamingo
 Humboldt penguin
 Oriental stork
 White cockatoo

Aviary Zone and Surrounding Area
Flight Aviary 
Home to free-flying waterbirds, the aviary has springs, dams, streams and forest, recreating a natural environment.

 Eastern spot-billed duck
 Little egret
 Mallard
 Mandarin duck
 White stork

Friendship Garden
Established in April 2022, visitors are allowed to interact with domestic animals.

Animals:

 Goat
 Guinea pig
 Noma horse
 Sheep

Bear House
 Polar bear
 Spectacled bear
 Sun bear

Pheasant House
 Edwards's pheasant
 Green pheasant
 Helmeted guineafowl
 Laughing kookaburra
 Satyr tragopan
 Temminck's tragopan

Other animals
 California sea lion

References

Access
Osaka Municipal Subway Midosuji Line: Dobutsuen-mae Station
Osaka Municipal Subway Sakaisuji Line: Ebisucho Station
JR West, Osaka Municipal Subway: Tennoji Station
JR West, Nankai Railway: Shin-Imamiya Station
Hankai Tramway Hankai Line: Minami-Kasumicho Station
Kintetsu Minami Osaka Line: Osaka Abenobashi Station
Osaka City Bus: Dobutsuen-mae, Tennoji-koen-mae (Shinsekai Gate), Abenobashi (Tennoji Gate)

External links

Osaka Municipal Recreation and Tourism Bureau
Official site

1915 establishments in Japan
Tourist attractions in Osaka
Zoos in Japan
Buildings and structures in Osaka
Zoos established in 1915